Küss is a surname. Notable people by that name include:

 Émile Küss (1815-1871), French physician.
 Georges Albert Küss (1867-1936), French physiologist. Head of laboratory at Trousseau Hospital.
 Georges Küss (1877-1967), French surgeon.
 René Küss (1913–2006), French urologist.

References